Carpinus betulus, the European or common hornbeam, is a species of tree in the birch family Betulaceae, native to Western Asia and central, eastern, and southern Europe, including southern England. It grows in mixed stands with oak, and in some areas beech, and is also a common tree in scree forests. Hornbeam was also known as yoke elm.

Description

The bark is smooth and greenish-grey, even in old trees. It is monoecious, and the wind-pollinated male and female catkins appear in early summer after the leaves.

The wood is heavy and hard, and is used for tools and building constructions. It also burns hot and slowly, making it very suitable for firewood. This was the reason for lopping and hence indirectly the saving of Epping Forest, where the hornbeam was a favoured pollarding tree.

Hornbeam was frequently coppiced and pollarded in the past in England. It is still infrequently managed using these traditional methods, but mainly for non-commercial conservation purposes. As a woodland tree traditionally managed in this way, it is particularly frequent in the ancient woodlands of south Essex, Hertfordshire and north Kent where it typically occupies more than half of most ancient woods and wood pastures.

Because it stands up well to cutting back and has dense foliage, it has been much used in landscape gardening, mainly as tall hedges and for topiary.  It was the classic tree used in French formal gardens for hedges in bosquets, as in the Gardens of Versailles, and in their English equivalent, the garden wilderness. 

The leaves provide food for some animals, including Lepidoptera such as the case-bearer moth Coleophora anatipennella.

There are a number of notable forests where C. betulus is a dominant tree species, among which are:
Epping Forest, Essex/London, UK
Halltorp Nature Reserve, Öland, Sweden

Ecology
In England, trees appear to prefer soils with a pH from 3.6 to 4.6 but tolerate up to 7.6. They are found on soils with moderate clay content and avoid soils with particularly high or low clay content.
Carpinus betulus likes full sun or partial shade, moderate soil fertility and moisture. It has a shallow, wide-spreading root system and is marked by the production of stump sprouts when cut back. 

The seeds often do not germinate till the spring of the second year after sowing. The hornbeam is a prolific seeder and is marked by vigorous natural regeneration.

Fossil record
Three fossil fruits of  Carpinus betulus have been extracted from borehole samples of the Middle Miocene fresh water deposits in Nowy Sacz Basin, West Carpathians, Poland.

Cultivation & uses
Carpinus betulus is widely cultivated as an ornamental tree, for planting in gardens and parks throughout north west Europe.
There are several cultivars, notably:
 C. betulus 'Fastigiata' or 'Pyramidalis', a very fastigiate tree when young, which has become a popular urban street tree in the United Kingdom and other countries.
 C. betulus 'Frans Fontaine', a similar fastigiate tree to 'Fastigiata'

Both the species and the cultivar C. betulus 'Fastigiata' have gained the Royal Horticultural Society's Award of Garden Merit.

Notable examples
The Last Tree - The only tree that survived the devastation of the Battle of Delville Wood in 1916. It is preserved as part of the Delville Wood South African National Memorial near Longueval.
Lincoln's Hornbeam - Planted by President Lincoln at the United States Botanic Garden in the Capitol grounds, Washington D.C.

Gallery

References

External links 

Den virtuella floran: Carpinus betulus distribution
Carpinus betulus - information, genetic conservation units and related resources. European Forest Genetic Resources Programme (EUFORGEN)

betulus
Flora of Europe
Flora of Western Asia
Flora of England
Flora of Italy
Trees of Asia
Trees of Europe
Plants described in 1753
Taxa named by Carl Linnaeus
Garden plants of Asia
Garden plants of Europe
Ornamental trees